This is a list of the four wing support groups in the United States Marine Corps. They provide the Marine air wings with organic and deployable combat support, and combat service support centralized for economy of personnel and equipment.

United States Marine Corps wing support groups